Prewitt is an unincorporated community and census-designated place in McKinley County, New Mexico, United States. Prewitt has a post office with ZIP code 87045.

Geography 
Prewitt is within the Baca/Prewitt (Kin Łigaaí) Chapter House boundary in the "Checkerboard Area" of the Navajo Nation. This means that Prewitt lies within the external boundaries of the Navajo Nation, but contains a mix of tribal, BLM, state, and private lands. It is a part of the Zuni Uplift, and is characterized by piñon/juniper woodland, red rock hoodoos, mesas, and desert grasslands.

Demographics

Education 

Prewitt is the home of Baca /Dlo'Ay Azhi Community School run by the Bureau of Indian Education.  Baca /Dlo'Ay Azhi Community School serves grades K-6. The Associated Deputy Director for this school is Navajo Schools in Window Rock, AZ and the Education Resource Center is Crownpoint.

It is in Gallup-McKinley County Public Schools. Zoned schools are Thoreau Elementary School, Thoreau Middle School, and Thoreau High School.

Points of interest 

 Bluewater Lake State Park
 Casamero Pueblo
 Trail of the Ancients Scenic Byway
 Prewitt Fairgrounds, home of the annual Bi-County Fair 
 Historic Route 66

Notable people 
 Paddy Martinez, prospector who discovered uranium at Haystack Mesa

See also

 List of census-designated places in New Mexico

References

External links

Census-designated places in McKinley County, New Mexico
Census-designated places in New Mexico
Unincorporated communities in McKinley County, New Mexico
Unincorporated communities in New Mexico